The Mud Run disaster was a train wreck that occurred on October 10, 1888, at Mud Run station in Kidder Township, Carbon County, Pennsylvania, on the Lehigh Valley Railroad. At 10 p.m., one train ran into the back of another, killing 64 people.

Trains
The trains were taking home members of the Catholic Total Abstinence Union of America from a 20,000-person rally in Hazleton, Pennsylvania. Altogether, 10,000 were returning to Luzerne and Lackawanna counties via the railroad. To accommodate this many passengers, eight trains were provided ("laid on"), running at ten-minute intervals. Each train had between 8 and 12 cars and was headed by two engines to cope with the steep grades between Penn Haven and Hazle Creek Junctions through what is now the Lehigh Gorge State Park. Lookouts (the brakemen and firemen) were posted on each of the engines to watch ahead for signals.

The first five trains passed through the Mud Run station area without incident. As the sixth train passed through, it stopped  beyond the station as there was no  'All Clear' signal displayed ahead. There was a red light on the rear car of this train, indicating its presence and serving as a stop signal for any approaching train. Unfortunately, the station was on a curve making it difficult to see the idled train. The flagman, James Hannigan, of the idled train walked back along the track to warn the seventh train, which was then approaching Mud Run. During an inquest conducted by Coroner A. J. Horn of Carbon County on the morning after the accident, Hannigan stated that he had gone  from the rear of the idled train and that "he did not know about a rule requiring that he go back a distance of sixteen telegraph poles as required by LVRR regulations." The seventh train, headed westbound, had passed an eastbound train, which would normally indicate that the single track area of the line ahead was now clear. The lookouts on the seventh train (Hugh Mulhearn and Joseph Pohl) failed to see the red signal at Mud Run station and by the time they noticed the light being waved frantically by the flagman of the sixth train, it was too late to avoid a collision.

Collision
The full length of the lead engine telescoped into the rear car (car 210) and drove it two thirds of its length into the next car (car 204). Only two excursionists, John Curran of Pleasant Valley and James Jennings of Minooka, survived in the rear car 'on all sides hung mangled bodies and limbs' whilst the second was described as 'crowded with maimed and bleeding bodies'. An attempt was made to withdraw the engine from the third car but brought 'such awful cries of distress that it was abandoned'. In all 64 were killed and scores injured; 32 of the dead were from the small village of Pleasant Valley (recently renamed Avoca) or Moosic and attended St. Mary's Roman Catholic Church, many were teenage members of the Drum and Bugle Corps of the St. Aloysius Society.

Charges
On Section 6, the idled and telescoped section, Conductor Charles Terry and Brakeman and Lookout James Hannigan were found guilty of gross negligence by the Coroner of Carbon County and his six jurymen. On Section 7, the leading engine, Conductor Joseph Keithline of Wilkes-Barre, Engineer Henry Cook of Wilkes Barre, Fireman and Lookout Hugh Gallagher, and Brakeman and Lookout Joseph Pohl were also found guilty of gross negligence. On Section 7, the second engine that controlled the brakes, Engineer Thomas Major of Mauch Chunk and Brakeman James Mulhearn were found guilty of gross negligence. One of the lookouts even admitted to having seen a red light but 'did not think the red light meant anything, as nobody used it'! In January 1889, the cases against Conductors Terry and Keithline and lookouts Mulhearn and Pohl were ignored. Cook and Hannigan were tried together and were acquitted. Major, who was tried separately, was also acquitted.

List of those killed
All names come from "Our Broken Ranks 1888/89 —Commemoration of the Catholic Total Abstinence Union" and The Mud Run Train Wreck - A Disaster in the Irish-American Community 

John Rogan - Jessup
James Flynn - Miner's Mill 
Anthony Mulligan - Olyphant

From Minooka (now a part of Scranton):
James Conaboy  
William Cusick 
Festus Mulherin/Mulkerin
James Mullen
Patrick Powell 
Richard Powell
Rose Powell
Thomas Toole

From Pleasant Valley (Avoca):
John Barrett
Martin Barrett
James Brehony
Bridgit Brehony
John M. Coleman
 John Coleman
Michael Coleman
Patrick Curran 
Abram Doran 
Lewis Doran
William Earley
Kate Featherstone
Matthew Flaherty
Austin Gibbons
James Jackson (son of Frank)
James Jackson (son of Henry)
Patrick Keenan
William Kelly
John J. McAndrew
Margaret McAndrew
Thomas F. McAndrew 
Bernard Meehan
Mary (Polly Meehan) 
Benjamin O'Brien
Thomas Ruddy
John Walsh
Patrick Walsh
Michael Whelan Jr.

From Moosic:
James Lynott 
John Lynott
Thomas Morrissey
Charles Goelitz

From Scranton:
John Ahearn
 Michael Dolan
William Duhigg
James Farry
James Gallagher
John J. Gibson (or Gibbons)
James Hart
Maggie Hart
Martin Hart
James Keating
Katie Kennedy
Owen Kilcullen
Peter Kline
Michael Maxwell
Edward O'Malley
Katie McNichols
Michael Moffit
Thomas Moran
William Noon
Patrick Smith
George Henry Stevens

References

Railway accidents in 1888
Railway accidents and incidents in Pennsylvania
Accidents and incidents involving Lehigh Valley Railroad
Temperance movement
Transportation in Carbon County, Pennsylvania
1888 in Pennsylvania
October 1888 events